Gowharan or Guharan may refer to:
 Gowharan, Hormozgan
 Gowharan, West Azerbaijan
 Gowharan District, in Hormozgan province
 Gowharan Rural District (Khoy County), West Azerbaijan province